Just Business is a 2008 Canadian thriller film directed by Jonathan Dueck and starring Gina Gershon, Jonathan Watton, Earl Pastko, and Zachary Bennett. The movie was released on DVD on May 6, 2008.

Plot
Elizar Perla is a retired art thief intent on committing his last crime. He targets David Gray, a famous art and rarities collector. Once the job is done, he disappears. Then the story focuses on the aftermath of the crime as the wealthy collector is desperate to get one particular painting back. Perla's daughter, lawyer Marty, agrees to track the missing artwork as her father is the main suspect (hence the name of the film).

Cast
Gina Gershon as Marty Jameson
Jonathan Watton as David Gray
Earl Pastko as Eli Perla
Zachary Bennett as David Snow
John Robinson as Tom Esposito
Anthony J. Mifsud as Tony Bloom

Reception

—Oliver Good, The National

References

External links
 
 

2008 films
English-language Canadian films
Canadian thriller films
2008 thriller films
2000s English-language films
2000s Canadian films